Greatest Hits Volume Two is Reba McEntire's second compilation album for MCA Records.
The album debuted at number 3 on the Country Albums chart for the week of October 16, 1993, and it peaked at #1 for the week of January 22, 1994. It stayed in the Top 10 for 12 weeks and came off the charts at number 47 for the week of January 11, 1997.

On the Billboard 200 the album debuted at number 8 for the week of October 16, 1993, and moved up to its #5 peak the following week. It increased sales to over 183,000 during Christmas week. This would remain her best selling week sales until 14 years later when Reba: Duets opened at 300,000 sales. It was taken off the charts at number 184 for the week of January 6, 1996.

Greatest Hits Volume Two went on to become the best-selling album of McEntire's career, being certified five times platinum by the RIAA. It has gone to sell almost 11 million copies worldwide.

Content
Two new songs were recorded for this compilation, both were released as singles. "Does He Love You", a duet that McEntire recorded with Linda Davis (then a background singer in McEntire's road band), was the first single and turned out to be a smash. It reached number 1 on the country charts. The song also earned them a Grammy award for Best Country Vocal Collaboration as well as the CMA Award for "Vocal Event of the Year".  CMT ranked the song at No. 9 on their list of 100 Greatest Duets. "Does He Love You" is the first of three duets featuring Reba and Linda Davis.

The album's other new track was "They Asked About You", which peaked at No. 7 on the country chart.

McEntire produced the album in its entirety, working with Jimmy Bowen on "Walk On" and "Love Will Find Its Way to You", and Tony Brown on all other tracks.

Track listing

Personnel on tracks 1 and 6 
 Reba McEntire – lead vocals
 Mike Rojas – acoustic piano
 Doug Sizemore – synthesizers, string pads
 Steve Gibson – electric guitar
 Dann Huff – electric guitar
 Andy Reiss – electric guitar
 Joe McGlohon – acoustic guitar
 Lang Scott – acoustic guitar, backing vocals (6)
 Terry Crisp – steel guitar
 Charlie Anderson – bass guitar
 Scotty Hawkins – drums
 Linda Davis – lead and harmony  vocals (1), backing vocals (6)

Production 
 Reba McEntire – producer (1-10), makeup 
 Tony Brown – producer (1-4, 6, 7, 8, 10)
 Jimmy Bowen – producer (5, 9)
 Chuck Ainlay – recording (1, 6), mixing (1, 6), overdub recording (1, 6)
 John Guess – overdub recording (1, 6)
 Derek Bason – second engineer (1, 6)
 Graham Lewis – second engineer (1, 6)
 Glenn Meadows – digital editing (1, 6), mastering 
 Jessie Noble – project coordinator 
 Mickey Braithwaite – art direction, design 
 Peter Nash – photography 
 Pam Nicholson – hair, wardrobe 
 Sandi Spika – hair, wardrobe
 Narvel Blackstock – management 
 Starstruck Entertainment – management company 

Studios 
 Tracks 1 & 6 recorded at Emerald Sound Studio (Nashville, TN).
 Overdubs recorded at The Music Mill - Studio B (Nashville, TN).
 Mixed and Mastered at Masterfonics (Nashville, TN).

Charts and certifications

Weekly charts

Singles

Year-end charts

Certifications/sales

References

1993 greatest hits albums
Albums produced by Tony Brown (record producer)
Reba McEntire compilation albums
MCA Records compilation albums